Royal Charles was an 80-gun first-rate three-decker ship of the line of the English Navy.  She was built by Peter Pett and launched at Woolwich Dockyard in 1655, for the navy of the Commonwealth of England. She was originally called Naseby, named in honour of Sir Thomas Fairfax's decisive 1645 victory over the Royalist forces during the English Civil Wars.  She was ordered in 1654 as one of a programme of four second rates, intended to carry 60 guns each.  However, she was altered during construction to mount a complete battery of guns along the upper deck (compared with the partial battery on this deck of her intended sisters, on which there were no gunports in the waist along this deck), and so was reclassed as a first rate.

In the run-up to the Restoration of the monarchy in May (June, New Style) of 1660, she was anchored in The Downs off Deal, where her laurel-crowned figurehead of Oliver Cromwell was removed before sailing to the Dutch Republic at the head of the fleet sent to bring King Charles II back to England, captained by Sir Edward Montagu and still under her Parliamentary name. On arrival in Scheveningen she took Charles and his entourage (including Samuel Pepys) on board. On 23 May 1660 the King and the Duke renamed her from Naseby to HMS Royal Charles. The ship landed them at Dover on 25 May.

Under her new name, she joined the Royal Navy, which formally came into being in 1660. At 1,229 tons, Naseby was larger than  built by Phineas Pett, Peter's father. Unlike Sovereign of the Seas, which was in service from 1637 to 1697, Naseby was to enjoy only twelve years in service.

As Royal Charles she took part in the Second Anglo-Dutch War. In 1665, she fought in the Battle of Lowestoft under the command of the Lord High Admiral, James Stuart, Duke of York, her captain being Sir William Penn. During that battle she probably destroyed the Dutch flagship Eendracht. In 1666, she participated in two further actions, the Four Days Battle and the defeat of Admiral Michiel de Ruyter in the St. James's Day Battle off the North Foreland.

In 1667, flagging English national morale was further depressed by the Raid on the Medway in which a Dutch fleet invaded the Thames and Medway rivers and on 12 June captured the uncommissioned Royal Charles, removing her with great skill to Hellevoetsluis in the United Provinces. The Dutch did not take her into naval service because it was considered that she drew too much water for general use on the Dutch coast. Instead the Royal Charles was permanently drydocked near Hellevoetsluis as a public attraction, with day trips being organised for large parties, often of foreign state guests. After vehement protests by Charles that this insulted his honour, the official visits were ended when she was auctioned for scrap in 1673. A mirror from the ship would eventually be returned to Britain in a conciliatory gesture in 2012.

The wooden carving showing the royal arms, originally placed on the ship's transom, was, however, preserved. After remaining at Hellevoetsluis for a while, it was brought to a naval shipbuilding yard in Rotterdam in the nineteenth century, and in 1855 was transferred to the Dutch navy's model collection. It is now on display in the Rijksmuseum in Amsterdam, which took most of the naval collection in the 1880s.

Footnotes

Notes

References

Lavery, Brian (2003) The Ship of the Line - Volume 1: The development of the battlefleet 1650–1850. Conway Maritime Press. .
  - 1 January 1659/60 – 30 March 1660/1
Royal Charles stern piece, preserved at the Rijksmuseum in Amsterdam.  

Ships of the line of the Royal Navy
1650s ships
Captured ships